Lolly-Madonna XXX (a.k.a. The Lolly-Madonna War) is a 1973 film directed by Richard C. Sarafian.  The film was co-written by Rodney Carr-Smith and Sue Grafton, based on the 1969 novel The Lolly-Madonna War by Grafton.

The movie was filmed in rural Union County, Tennessee.

Plot
Two families in rural Tennessee, headed by patriarchs Laban Feather and Pap Gutshall are at odds with each other. The sons of the two families play harmless tricks on each other but soon the Feather boys decide to kidnap a girl, escalating the rivalry. She turns out to be innocent bystander Roonie Gill, not the made-up Gutshall girlfriend "Lolly Madonna" that the Gutshall clan had invented to get the Feathers away from their still. As events escalate, Zack Feather and Roonie fall in love and try to bring the others to their senses, but to no avail. One family busts up another's still; and in retaliation, the sons of that family assault the daughter of the other. After the feud results in a fiery confrontation in a meadow, where one of the Feather boys is fatally wounded and the mother of the Gutshall kin is shot to death, the two families regroup in order to gear up for a final deadly confrontation. With the exception of Sister E Gutshall, who packs a suitcase and leaves home, the participants engage in battle at the Feather homestead. In the end, all combatants die.

Cast
Rod Steiger as Laban Feather
Robert Ryan as Pap Gutshall
Jeff Bridges as Zack Feather
Gary Busey as Zeb Gutshall
Katherine Squire as Chickie Feather
Season Hubley as Roonie Gill/Lolly Madonna
Ed Lauter as Hawk Feather
Paul Koslo as Villum Gutshall
Scott Wilson  as Thrush Feather
Kiel Martin as Ludie Gutshall
Randy Quaid as Finch Feather
Joan Goodfellow as Sister E Gutshall           
Timothy Scott as Skylar Feather
Tresa Hughes as Elspeth Gutshall   
Kathy Watts as  Lyda Jo Gutshall Feather

Critical reception
The film had a mixed reception from the critics. Vincent Canby of The New York Times starts his review as follows: 

On the other hand, Variety had this to say:

See also
 List of American films of 1973

References

External links 
 
 
 
 Original New York Times review
 Knoxville News Sentinel Photo Gallery of East Tennessee Movie Making: Lolly-Madonna XXX (1973)

1973 drama films
1973 films
Films about child abduction in the United States
Films based on American novels
Films about feuds
Films set in Tennessee
Films shot in Tennessee
Metro-Goldwyn-Mayer films
American drama films
Films directed by Richard C. Sarafian
1970s English-language films
1970s American films